George Felton (born December 28, 1952) is a former American college basketball coach.  He was the head coach of the South Carolina Gamecocks men's basketball team from 1986 to 1991. Felton has also served as a college scout for the NBA's Indiana Pacers.

References

1952 births
Living people
American men's basketball coaches
American men's basketball players
Appalachian State Mountaineers men's basketball coaches
East Carolina Pirates men's basketball coaches
Georgia Tech Yellow Jackets men's basketball coaches
Indiana Pacers scouts
Kentucky Wildcats men's basketball coaches
North Carolina A&T Aggies men's basketball coaches
South Carolina Gamecocks men's basketball coaches
South Carolina Gamecocks men's basketball players